Robert Howard Young (September 15, 1917 – September 10, 1951) professionally known as Clifton Young, was an American film actor.

Early years 
Young was the son of Mr. and Mrs. Edward A. Young. His father started him in vaudeville when he was 5 years old. When he was 7, he began acting in Our Gang comedies. Young was drafted into the Army during World War II, serving in the South Pacific.

Career
Young played "Bonedust" in nineteen Our Gang films from 1925 to 1931, his most notable film being School's Out. As an adult, to avoid confusion with established star Robert Young, he took his mother's maiden name, Clifton (Eva Clifton) as his screen name.

Young became a contract player at Warner Bros., landing small parts in a number of 1940s film noir and western films. Notable credits include Nora Prentiss, Pursued, Possessed, Dark Passage, and Blood on the Moon.

While at Warners, Young was featured prominently in the Joe McDoakes comedy shorts. He played a variety of roles: a craven mobster in So You Want to Be a Detective, a department-store clerk in So You're Going on Vacation, and memorably as "Homer," Joe's brash, know-it-all office colleague in several McDoakes reels.

One of Young's last films was the Roy Rogers western Trail of Robin Hood, in which he played a sneering villain.

Death
Young died on September 10, 1951, in a hotel fire that started when he fell asleep while smoking.

Filmography

References

External links
 
 

1917 births
1951 deaths
20th-century American male actors
American male child actors
American male comedy actors
American male film actors
Deaths from fire in the United States
Hal Roach Studios actors
Military personnel from New York (state)
Our Gang
United States Army personnel of World War II
United States Army soldiers